Xinhua Township is a township of Pingbian County in southeastern Yunnan province, China, located  north of the county seat and  east-southeast of Mengzi City as the crow flies. , it has nine villages under its administration.

References 

Township-level divisions of Honghe Hani and Yi Autonomous Prefecture